Kuih lidah is a traditional kuih for the Bruneian Malay people in Papar in the states of Sabah in Malaysia.

References 

Bruneian cuisine
Malaysian snack foods